This list of tallest buildings in Grand Rapids ranks buildings in the U.S. city of Grand Rapids, Michigan by height.

Tallest buildings

This includes spires and architectural details but does not include antenna masts. Existing structures are included for ranking purposes.

Tallest proposed

Timeline of tallest buildings

See also
List of tallest buildings in Michigan

References
General
Emporis.com - Grand Rapids
Specific

External links
Diagram of Grand Rapids skyscrapers on SkyscraperPage

 
Grand Rapids
Tallest in Grand Rapids